Dimitrios Raptakis (Greek: Δημήτριος Ραπτάκης; born 20 January 1988) is a Greek professional football player who playing for OFI Crete.

External links
 AEL 1964 FC Official
 Sportlarissa.gr
 Profile at Mysports.gr

1988 births
Living people
Greek expatriate footballers
Athlitiki Enosi Larissa F.C. players
Association football defenders
Footballers from Heraklion
Greek footballers